Coxford is an Electoral Ward in the Unitary Authority of Southampton, England. It had a population of 14,232 at the 2001 census.

References

Wards of Southampton
Housing estates in Hampshire